Illmensee is a municipality of the district of Sigmaringen in Baden-Württemberg, Germany.

History
Illmensee was mediatized to the Grand Duchy of Baden in 1803, whose government assigned the township to the district of Pfullendorf. It was reassigned in 1843 to the district of Heiligenberg, which was dissolved in 1938 into the district of Überlingen. Illmensee expanded dramatically after World War II, particularly in the 1960s, when the municipality industrialized.

Geography
The municipality (Gemeinde) of Illmensee is situated at the southeastern corner of the district of Sigmaringen, in the German state of Baden-Württemberg. Illmensee lies along Sigmaringen's border with the district of Ravensburg to the east and the Bodensee district to the south. The municipality's three lakes, the Illmensee itself, and the  lakes, are glacial lakes that were also formed by the Würm glaciation. Elevation above sea level in the municipal area ranges from a high of  Normalnull (NN) to a low of  NN.

The Federally-protected  nature reserve is located in Illmensee's municipal area.

Politics

Coat of arms
Illmensee's coat of arms depicts a white fish leaping over a yellow, three-pointed hill upon a field of red. The coat of arms was taken from the House of Irmensee, a noble family that went extinct in Switzerland in 1591.

Transport

References

External links
  (in German)

Sigmaringen (district)
Baden